The Mechanics' Institute, 103 Princess Street, Manchester, is notable as the building in which three significant British institutions were founded: the Trades Union Congress (TUC),  the Co-operative Insurance Society (CIS) and the University of Manchester Institute of Science and Technology (UMIST). In the 1960s it was occupied by the Manchester College of Commerce. It has been a Grade II* listed building since 11 May 1972.

History

Early years
The institute, which was one of many, was established in Manchester on 7 April 1824 at the Bridgewater Arms hotel. Its purpose  was to provide facilities for working men to learn the principles of science through part-time study. The original prospectus of the institute stated 

The most notable of the founders were William Fairbairn, Richard Roberts, George William Wood, George Philips, Joseph Brotherton and Benjamin Heywood. The last of these chaired the first meeting, became the leading patron and is often considered to be the founder. Many of these men shared similar interests, such as being Unitarians and members of the Manchester Literary and Philosophical Society, aside from a desire to improve the commercial, industrial and technological life of Manchester. In this regard, Brotherton stood out as a deviation from the norm, for example in politics and religion. Others among the founders were James Murray, Thomas Hopkins, J. C. Dyer and Phillip Novelli, all of whom were later significant figures in the Anti-Corn Law League.

In 1825 the first building in England expressly designed for use as a mechanics' institute was erected for its use in Cooper Street, off Princess Street, in Manchester. This was demolished in the early 1970s.

Although the original purpose of the institute was maintained, it was increasingly the case that emphasis was placed also on the wider social aspects of the organisation. Heywood's initial optimism regarding the moral upliftment of a significant number of working men through technical education was tempered by the realisation that tiredness and even employment status impeded its achievement. From around 1830, the scope of education was widened to include more elementary aspects, there were proposals to set up reading groups in surrounding areas that would be supplied with books from the institute's library, and also moves to encourage involvement in sports and in general social events. Mostly led from the top, although occasionally the result of explicit demands from its membership, the changes included the creation of a room for reading newspapers, a change in the type of lectures, which became less rigidly based on scientific topics, as also did the library stock, and events such as concerts, exhibitions and excursions played a more important role. Facilities for educating women and children were also introduced but, for example, a request to begin classes in history was rejected because of fears that it would lead to debates about politics.

This institute organised the first City exhibition in 1837 and this led to a large number of similar exhibitions in English industrial towns and cities. By the 1840s, the exhibitions included thousands of casts, busts and masks relating to the fashionable subject of phrenology and were attracting over 100,000 visitors. The Manchester Phrenological Society used its facilities.

Relocation
The institute moved to the current building in 1855. The building was designed by J. E. Gregan in an Italian palazzo style and was Gregan's last work. It consists of three tall storeys with a basement and blind attic storey and is constructed of brick with stone dressings. "It set a standard for the scale of the commercial warehouses which were to follow, but the nobility and purity of the design sets it apart from its neighbours."

The inaugural meeting of the Trades Union Congress was held in the building, 2–6 June 1868. In 1882 it was decided to establish a technical school, the Technical School and Mechanics' Institution; it opened in September 1882. This was the beginning of the institution later known as UMIST.

Present day
As of 2002 the building contained archives from the National Labour History Museum, which were subsequently relocated with that museum.

Alumni
 Mary Louisa Armitt who founded the Armitt Library was educated here.

See also

Grade II* listed buildings in Greater Manchester
Listed buildings in Manchester-M1

References

Sources
 Pevsner, Nicholas; Hartwell, Clare & Hyde, Matthew, The Buildings of England: Lancashire — Manchester and the South East (2004) Yale University Press

External links
 Manchester Mechanics' Institution archive, University of Manchester Library.

Grade II* listed buildings in Manchester
Trades Union Congress
University of Manchester